Areni Municipality, referred to as Areni Community ( Areni Hamaynk), is a rural community and administrative subdivision of Vayots Dzor Province of Armenia, at the southeast of the country. Consisted of a group of settlements, its administrative centre is the village of Areni.

Included settlements

References

Communities in Vayots Dzor Province
2017 establishments in Armenia